Rio Grande Valley Premium Outlets is a  shopping center located in Mercedes, Texas, located on Interstate 2 (Expressway 83).
It is owned and managed by Simon Property Group, and part of Simon's Premium Outlets family of outlet malls. The shopping center has 140 stores.

History 
It was expanded in 2008.

References

External links 
 

Premium Outlets
Shopping malls in Texas
Buildings and structures in Hidalgo County, Texas
Shopping malls established in 2006